Aftout or Barkewol is a department of Assaba Region in Mauritania.

List of municipalities in the department 
The Aftout department is made up of eight municipalities:

 Barkeol
 Bou Lahrath
 Daghveg
 El Ghabra
 Gueller
 Lebhir
 Leouossy
 Rdheidhi.

In 2000, the entire population of the Aftout Department has a total of 62,238 inhabitants  (29,538 men and 32,700 women).

References 

Departments of Mauritania